Nicole (c. 1424after 3 January 1480) was Countess of Penthièvre from 1454 until her death.

Biography 
Nicole was the daughter of Charles, Seigneur d'Avaugour, and Isabeau de Vivonne. Her father was the third son of John I, Count of Penthièvre, son of Charles of Blois and Joan, Duchess of Brittany, but he died in 1434. When her elder uncles, Olivier and John II died, she succeeded to the county of Penthièvre as primogeniture heir. With her succession, she also inherited the Penthièvre claim to the Breton ducal throne. On 3 January 1480, she sold her rights to Brittany to Louis XI of France for 50,000 livres.

Family 
Nicole married on 18 June 1437 Jean II de Brosse (1423 – 1482), with whom she had:
 Jean III de Brosse (died 1502), her successor
 Antoine, married Jeanne de La Praye
 Pauline de Brosse, married John II, Count of Nevers
 Claudine de Brosse (1450–1513), married Philip II, Duke of Savoy
 Bernarde of Brosse, married William VIII, Marquess of Montferrat
 Hélène of Brosse, married Boniface III, Marquess of Montferrat, brother of William VIII

References

Sources 

House of Châtillon
Counts of Penthièvre
1480 deaths